Doon School Ground is a multi-purpose school ground in Dehradun, Uttarakhand.

Cricket, hockey, athletics, boxing and association football are played seasonally. Tennis, table tennis, badminton, squash, basketball, swimming and gymnastics tournaments are also available. Sport is dominated by cricket and hockey during the spring term and by football, athletics and boxing in the autumn term. Inter-house matches are played in cricket, hockey and football. Sports facilities include a 25-metre swimming pool, a boxing ring and a multi-purpose hall with a gymnasium and facilities for indoor badminton, basketball and table tennis.

There are two artificial turf cricket pitches, five basketball courts, six tennis courts, four squash courts, ten cricket nets, seven fields for hockey and football (which can be converted to four cricket pitches to accommodate seasonal sports), a modern cricket pavilion and two 400-metre athletics tracks.

The ground has hosted three Ranji Trophy matches for Uttar Pradesh in 1951 against Assam which was won by Uttar Pradesh by an innings and 208 runs. The second was played in 1951 between Uttar Pradesh and Holkar, with the match ending in a draw. The third was played in 1970 between Uttar Pradesh and Madhya Pradesh, with this match also ending in a draw.

References

External links 

 Cricinfo
 Cricketarchive

Sports venues in Uttarakhand
Buildings and structures in Dehradun
Sport in Dehradun
Cricket grounds in Uttarakhand
Defunct cricket grounds in India
The Doon School
Sports venues completed in 1951
1951 establishments in Uttar Pradesh
20th-century architecture in India